Alan Keane is an inter-county Gaelic football goalkeeper for Galway. He has battled with Brian O'Donoghue for the position of first choice goalkeeper.

Playing career
He made his debut for Galway in 2001 and has won 3 Connacht Senior Football Championship medals and 1 All-Ireland. He was called into the playing squad with no former inter-county experience at under age. He has also won Galway senior medals with his club and represented Connacht in the railway cup.

References

Year of birth missing (living people)
Living people
Gaelic football goalkeepers
Galway inter-county Gaelic footballers
Killererin Gaelic footballers
Winners of one All-Ireland medal (Gaelic football)